Michał Hieronim Krasiński (1712 – May 25, 1784) was a Polish noble known for being one of the one of the leaders of Bar Confederation (1768–1772). He was cześnik of Stężyca, podkomorzy of Różan, starost of Opiniogóra, and deputy to many Sejms. 

He was a captain in August III army. He was a member of parliament in 1748 and 1750 as a deputate from Sandomierz voivodoship and in 1756, 1758 and 1760.

He was the brother of Adam Stanisław Krasiński, the father of Jan Krasiński and Adam Krasiński, and the grandfather of Wincenty Krasiński. He was buried in Krasne.

Members of the Sejm of the Polish–Lithuanian Commonwealth
Bar confederates
Radom confederates
Michal Hieronim
1712 births
1784 deaths